Kenneth Luke Prokopec (born 23 February 1978) is an Australian-born, right-handed pitcher who played in Major League Baseball for the Los Angeles Dodgers and Toronto Blue Jays.

While with the Dodgers in 2000 and 2001, the tandem of Prokopec and fellow Australian Jeff Williams gained considerable popularity in the Los Angeles area. However, the attention was short lived, as both moved on to other franchises.  Prokopec was traded to Toronto on 13 December 2001 with Chad Ricketts in exchange for César Izturis and Paul Quantrill.

Prokopec's 2002 tenure with the Toronto Blue Jays was unsuccessful, as he went 2-9 and sustained a labral tear injury late in the season. In short order, the Blue Jays granted Prokopec free agency in October 2002.  The Los Angeles Dodgers then signed him that November, but kept him off their 40-man roster, and the Cincinnati Reds subsequently claimed Prokopec from Los Angeles in the Rule 5 Draft in December. However, Prokopec would never throw another pitch (in either the majors or the minors) for any organization—further labral problems occurred, forcing Prokopec's early retirement from professional baseball at the age of 24.

Prokopec returned to Australia, and in 2013 was a baseball instructor for the Queensland Academy of Sport in Brisbane.

Pitching style
Prokopec threw an 88–96 MPH four-seam fastball, an 82–86 MPH slider, an 81–83 MPH changeup, and a 75–77 MPH curveball.

References

External links

1978 births
Australian expatriate baseball players in Canada
Australian expatriate baseball players in the United States
Living people
Major League Baseball players from Australia
Major League Baseball pitchers
Los Angeles Dodgers players
Toronto Blue Jays players
Great Falls Dodgers players
Savannah Sand Gnats players
San Antonio Missions players
San Bernardino Stampede players
Las Vegas 51s players
Syracuse SkyChiefs players